Yonnette Fleming (born 1968) is an American urban farmer and community earth steward based in Bedford–Stuyvesant, Brooklyn. Fleming is part of the environmental movement, her work focusing on urban community gardens and black farmers.

Early life
Yonnette Fleming was born in Guyana. Her family worked with indigenous communities, growing coconuts, sugar, rice, and other crops. She immigrated to New York in 1983 from Georgetown, Guyana.

Career
Yonnette Fleming joined Hattie Carthan Community Garden, located at Marcy and Lafayette in Brooklyn's Bedford-Stuyvesant neighborhood, in 2003 while working on Wall Street. In 2008, she left her Wall Street job in order to commit to herself to community resilience and food. In 2009, she helped establish the farmers market. She is currently an urban food justice educator, and vice president of the Hattie Carthan Community Garden and her work addresses food security and food justice concerns. She teaches inter-generational workshops including cooking, urban farming, herbalism, and plant medicine while focusing on the needs of the community. Within her workshops, she calls on participants to think on how structures of oppression have impacted their own lives and how to confront them.

Fleming is also a member of the Farm School's advisory board where she teaches a food justice course. In addition to her work as a food advocate, Fleming is an ordained minister, plant and sound medicine practitioner, reiki master, and herbalist.

References

External links
Hattie Carthan Community Garden Website

Guyanese emigrants to the United States
Living people
Education activists
American anti-racism activists
American human rights activists
Activists for African-American civil rights
American women's rights activists
Farmers practicing sustainable agriculture
American community activists
American environmentalists
American women environmentalists
American anti-poverty advocates
Sustainability advocates
People from Bedford–Stuyvesant, Brooklyn
Activists from New York (state)
Reiki practitioners
African-American farmers
American women farmers
1968 births
Women civil rights activists
21st-century African-American people
21st-century African-American women
20th-century African-American people
20th-century African-American women
Urban farmers